Christian Dubé (born 3 October 1956 in Quebec City) is Canadian politician. He is a member of the National Assembly of Quebec for the riding of La Prairie, and serves as Minister of Health and Social Services.

He was first elected in the 2012 election as the representative of Lévis for the Coalition Avenir Québec (CAQ), and was re-elected in 2014.

On 15 August 2014, Dubé resigned his seat to take a job at the Caisse de dépôt et placement. On 3 September 2018, Dubé announced that he would run for the 2018 election in the riding of La Prairie, replacing Stéphane Le Bouyonnec as the CAQ's candidate. He would defeat Liberal incumbent Richard Merlini.

On 22 June 2020, as part of a cabinet shuffle, Dubé was named the new Minister of Health and Social Services, succeeding Danielle McCann.

Cabinet posts

References

External links
 

1956 births
Living people
Canadian accountants
Coalition Avenir Québec MNAs
French Quebecers
Members of the Executive Council of Quebec
People from Lévis, Quebec
Politicians from Quebec City
21st-century Canadian politicians
Université Laval alumni
Black Canadian politicians